Uday Kumar Abhay (born 17 August 1983) is an Indian cricketer. He made his Twenty20 debut on 8 November 2019, for Mizoram in the 2019–20 Syed Mushtaq Ali Trophy. He made his first-class debut on 4 February 2020, for Mizoram in the 2019–20 Ranji Trophy.

References

External links
 

1983 births
Living people
Indian cricketers
Mizoram cricketers